Demetris Morant (born August 20, 1992) is an American professional basketball player for the CSM Focșani of the Romanian Liga Națională. At a height of 2.06 m (6'9") tall, he can play at both the power forward and center positions. He finished his college basketball career at Florida Gulf Coast University.

High school
Morant attended Bishop Gorman High School, in Summerlin, Nevada, where he played high school basketball. With the school, he won two Nevada state championships. He also played two times at the City of Palms Classic.

College career
Morant played college basketball at the University of Nevada, Las Vegas (UNLV), with the UNLV Runnin' Rebels, from 2013 to 2014. He then played college basketball at Florida Gulf Coast University, with the Florida Gulf Coast Eagles, from 2014 to 2017. In  his senior season at Florida Gulf Coast, he was named to the ASUN Conference All-Tournament Team, and was named the ASUN Conference Defensive Player of the Year.

Professional career
On August 17, 2017, Greek club Aris Thessaloniki announced that Morant would join the training camp of the team in late August. He later signed a 2-year contract (with the 2nd year being a team option) with the Greek League club. He was officially released from the Greek club on December 9, 2017. On July 18, 2018, Morant signed with the German club Artland Dragons.

In 2020, Morant signed with Adroit of the Thailand Basketball League. He averaged 11 points, 18.3 rebounds, 2.0 steals and 1.7 assists per game. He subsequently joined KB Ylli of tho Kosovan league, averaging 8.7 points, 8.8 rebounds, 1.1 steals and 1.0 assist per game. On October 7, 2021, Morant signed with CSM Focșani of the Romanian Liga Națională.

References

External links
Eurobasket.com Profile
Greek Basket League Profile 
College Bio

1992 births
Living people
American expatriate basketball people in Greece
American expatriate basketball people in Germany
American expatriate basketball people in Hungary
American expatriate basketball people in Kosovo
American expatriate basketball people in Thailand
American men's basketball players
Aris B.C. players
Artland Dragons players
Basketball players from Miami
Bishop Gorman High School alumni
Centers (basketball)
CSM Focșani players
Florida Gulf Coast Eagles men's basketball players
KB Ylli players
Power forwards (basketball)
UNLV Runnin' Rebels basketball players